The Outram Formation is a stratigraphic unit of Early Ordovician age that is present on the western edge of the Western Canada Sedimentary Basin in the Canadian Rockies of Alberta and British Columbia. It was named for Mount Outram in Banff National Park by J.D. Aitken and B.S. Norford in 1967. The Outram Formation is fossiliferous and includes remains of trilobites and other marine invertebrates, as well as stromatolites and thrombolites.

Lithology and deposition
The Outram Formation formed as a shallow and at times emergent marine shelf along the western shoreline of the North American Craton during Early Ordovician time. It consists primarily of nodular limestone, calcareous quartzose siltstone, limestone pebble-conglomerate, and brown shale. Nodules of grey chert occur throughout the formation.

Distribution and stratigraphic relationships
The Outram is present in the Rocky Mountains of Alberta and British Columbia. Its thickness and shale content increase toward the west. It overlies the Survey Peak Formation and underlies the Skoki Formation. Both contacts are gradational.

Paleontology
The Outram Formation contains several genera of trilobites, as well as brachiopods, conodonts, gastropods,  sponges, echinoderms, bivalves, gastropods, stromatolites, thrombolites, oncolites, rare graptolites, and others.

References

Geologic formations of Alberta
Stratigraphy of Alberta
Paleontology in Alberta
Ordovician Alberta
Ordovician southern paleotropical deposits
Fossiliferous stratigraphic units of North America